John Hatcher may refer to:

John Hatcher (commissioner) (1634–1678), English local official in Lincolnshire, a Member of Parliament for part of 1660
John Bell Hatcher (1861–1904), American paleontologist